Porm may refer to:

Misspelt form of porn
Porm, a dolphin that acted as a surrogate mother for Aquaman. Killed during the events of The Final Night. See List of Aquaman supporting characters 
Lake Porm, a lake in New Zealand. See List of lakes of New Zealand
Porm Pirom, one of three phleng talat artists, the others being Pongsri Woranuch and Toon Tongjai. They are showcased in "Phleng Chao Baan" ('folk song'). See Luk thung